The YCO Shine Masters were a Philippine Basketball League (then known as the Philippine Amateur Basketball League (PABL) team that played for three conferences through the 1986 and 1987 seasons, winning two PABL titles. The ballclub was owned by the Elizalde Group of Companies, which also owned its predecessor team, the YCO Painters and the original Tanduay franchise in the PBA.

The Shine Masters became the first commercial team of Alvin Patrimonio. He appeared in a TV commercial endorsing the YCO Paint Product in 1986.

The Shine Masters formed a strong line-up in their three conference appearance. YCO won the 1986 PABL Third Conference Crown, known as Filipino Cup, at the expense of ESQ-Sta.Lucia Realty.  Alvin Patrimonio was voted Conference MVP. Other players in that maiden lineup were Ato Agustin and Andy De Guzman. The following year, the Shine Masters would meet RFM-Swift Hotdogs twice for the championship, losing the first time when the Hotdogs benefited for getting top players like Jojo Lastimosa and Nelson Asaytono from eliminated teams. YCO gained a measure of revenge over RFM-Swift's the following conference via 3-0 sweep.

The team was disbanded ahead of the Tanduay team, brought about by the financial difficulties of its corporate parent. Afterwards, Patrimonio and teammate Glenn Capacio moved to RFM-Swift.

List of YCO players
Ato Agustin
Eric Altamirano
Josel Angeles
Glenn Capacio
Andy de Guzman
Nandy Garcia
Mar Anthony Magada
Ronnie Magsanoc
Loreto Manaog
Jaime Mariquit
Alvin Patrimonio
Adriano Polistico
Edgardo Roque, Jr.
Enerito Sebial
Jack Tanuan
Joel Valle
Arturo Versoza, Jr
Jerome Capacio

References

External links
 www.gameface.ph

See also
List of Philippine Basketball League champions

Former Philippine Basketball League teams